Kamangar Kola (also Romanized as Kamāngar Kolā) is a village in Harazpey-ye Jonubi Rural District, in the Central District of Amol County, Mazandaran Province, Iran. At the 2018 census, its population is 2556, in 853 families.  
Kamgorkala is like a small town with many amenities including a health center and a hospital, three bakeries, two cemeteries, a football field and a volleyball court, 15 supermarkets, 3 butchers, 4 taxis, and 8 rivers inside the village, There are 450 hectares of agricultural land, 16 livestock breeding cattle, sheep, horses, as well as 8 breeding poultry broiler and laying hens, two large mosques and sacred sites and gills.

References 

Populated places in Amol County